San Bernardo alle Terme is a Baroque style, Roman Catholic abbatial church located on Via Torino 94 in the rione Castro Pretorio of Rome, Italy.

History
The church was built on the remains of a circular tower, which marked a corner in the southwestern perimeter wall of the Baths of Diocletian (its pendant is today part of a hotel building, 225 meters southeast from San Bernardo alle Terme). These two towers flanked a large semicircular exedra;  the distance between the towers attests to enormous scale of the original structure.

In 1598, under the patronage of Caterina Sforza di Santafiora, this church was built for the French Cistercian group, the Feuillants, under the leadership of Giovanni Barreiro, abbot of Toulouse. Later, after the dissolution of the Feuillants during the French Revolution, the edifice and the annexed monastery were ceded to the Congregation of St. Bernard of Clairvaux, after whom the church is named.

The current Cardinal Priest of the Titulus S. Bernardi ad Thermas is George Alencherry.

Art and architecture

The structure of San Bernardo alle Terme is similar to the Pantheon, since it is cylindrical, with a dome and an oculus. The edifice has a diameter of 22 meters. The octagonal dome coffers recall those of the Basilica of Maxentius. The interior is graced by eight stucco statues of saints, each housed in wall niches, the work (c. 1600) of Camillo Mariani. These are a good example of the Mannerist sculpture. The Chapel of St Francis is an addition to the ancient rotunda, and contains a sculpture of St Francis by Giacomo Antonio Fancelli. The large canvases in the lateral altars are by Giovanni Odazzi.

The German painter Johann Friedrich Overbeck, founder of the Nazarene art movement, is buried here. The abbot Barreiro is buried left of the main altar; also buried in the church are the cardinals Francesco Gabrielli and Giovanni Bona of Monreale.

List of cardinal protectors
This church is the seat of cardinalatial title of S. Bernardi ad Thermas.

References

 Le chiese barocche di Roma, Federico Gizzi, Newton Compton, Rome, 1994

External links

 "San Bernardo alle Terme", by Nyborg.

Baroque architecture in Rome
Titular churches
16th-century Roman Catholic church buildings in Italy
Rotundas in Europe
Centralized-plan churches in Italy
Churches of Rome (rione Castro Pretorio)